Sander Sebastiaan Robert Jan de Wijn (born 2 May 1990) is a Dutch field hockey player who plays as a defender for Kampong and the Dutch national team.

At the 2012 Summer Olympics, he competed for the national team in the men's tournament winning a silver medal.  He also competed at the 2016 Summer Olympics.

References

External links
 

1990 births
Living people
Dutch male field hockey players
Male field hockey defenders
Field hockey players at the 2012 Summer Olympics
2014 Men's Hockey World Cup players
Field hockey players at the 2016 Summer Olympics
2018 Men's Hockey World Cup players
Field hockey players at the 2020 Summer Olympics
Olympic field hockey players of the Netherlands
People from Boxmeer
Sportspeople from North Brabant
Olympic silver medalists for the Netherlands
Olympic medalists in field hockey
Medalists at the 2012 Summer Olympics
SV Kampong players
Men's Hoofdklasse Hockey players
20th-century Dutch people
21st-century Dutch people